Kittilä Airport , , is a Finnish airport located in Kittilä inside the Arctic Circle. It handles general aviation and mostly seasonal international traffic and is one of the main airports in Northern Finland. During the winter, Kittilä receives visitors from countries such as Germany, France, United Kingdom, Russia, Ukraine, The Netherlands, Switzerland, Spain and Canada. It carried 363,161 passengers in 2019 and 206,251 passengers in 2020 (due to COVID-19) being the fourth busiest airport in Finland.

Airlines and destinations
The following airlines operate regular scheduled and charter flights at Kittilä Airport:

Statistics

Passengers

Cargo

Incidents and accidents
 On 27 July 2006, a fire broke out around 19:00 between the old terminal building and the new unfinished section of the new terminal. The airport was ready and operational again in December 2006, with the new terminal open.
On 4 January 2018, a Gulfstream G150 aircraft registered to Austria and carrying Russian passengers was being prepared for take-off to return to Russia when due to pressure built inside the aircraft the door slammed on the German captain killing him instantly. There were no passengers in the aircraft.

See also
 List of the busiest airports in the Nordic countries

References

External links

 Official website
 AIP Finland – Kittilä Airport
 
 
 

Airports in Finland
Airports in the Arctic
Airport
International airports in Finland
Buildings and structures in Lapland (Finland)